The discography of the American pop group the Carpenters consists of 14 studio albums, two Christmas albums, two live albums, 49 singles, and numerous compilation albums. The duo was made up of siblings Karen (lead vocals and drums) and Richard Carpenter (keyboards and vocals).

The siblings started their musical career together in the latter half of the 1960s. In October 1969, six months after they signed a contract with A&M Records, the Carpenters released their debut album Offering (its title was later changed to Ticket to Ride). Within a year, they rose to prominence with their chart-topping single "(They Long to Be) Close to You", a Burt Bacharach and Hal David composition that had not been commercially successful when it was recorded by television star Richard Chamberlain in 1963.

The Carpenters garnered worldwide commercial success, scoring big hits mainly in the first half of the 1970s. RIAA-certified sales of their records (albums, singles and videos) have been estimated at around 34.6 million units. In the United Kingdom, they are ranked as the seventh top-selling albums artist on the official record chart of the 1970s. During their career, the duo scores 1 number one album and another 4 Top 10 albums on Billboard 200, 3 number ones singles, 12 top 10 singles and 20 top 40 hits on Billboard Hot 100. They have also been the third-best-selling international music act in the Japanese market, only behind Mariah Carey and the Beatles. By 2005, they had reportedly sold more than 100 million copies of records worldwide.

Albums

Studio albums
Throughout their career, the Carpenters released 14 original albums, including two Christmas offerings. Most recently they released As Time Goes By in 2001 in Japan, and 2004 internationally.

Live albums
There are two live albums that the Carpenters have released officially, though neither of them were issued in their homeland.

Solo albums

Compilations
Following releases are "greatest-hits" albums of the Carpenters released in the United States, Canada, and/or the United Kingdom. 

 I Album only downloadable in the UK.
"—" denotes releases that did not chart.

Box sets

Limited releases
Golden Prize (Japan only)
Released: September 10, 1971
Label: A&M/King
Format: LP, cassette
Chart position(s): #3 (JPN)

Golden Double Deluxe (Japan only)
Released: February 10, 1972
Label: A&M/King
Format: LP
Chart position(s): #10 (JPN)

Great Hits of the Carpenters (Australia)
Released: 1972
Label: A&M/King
Format: LP
Chart position(s): #3 (AUS)

GEM I (Japan only)
Released: October 10, 1972
Label: A&M/King
Format: LP
Chart position(s): #13 (JPN)

MAX 20 (Japan only)
Released: March 10, 1973
Label: A&M/King
Format: LP
Chart position(s): #26 (JPN)

GEM II (Japan only)
Released: October 25, 1973
Label: A&M/King
Format(s): LP
Chart position(s): #3 (JPN)

Great Hits of the Carpenters Volume 2 (Australia)
Released: 1972
Label: A&M/King
Format: LP
Chart position(s): #24 (AUS)

Golden Prize Volume II (Japan only)
Released: April 10, 1974
Label: A&M/King
Format(s): LP, cassette
Chart position(s): #1 (JPN)

Big Star (Japan only)
Released: June 1, 1974
Label: A&M/King
Format(s): Cassette
Chart position(s): #20 (JPN)

Special Series (Japan only)
Released: November 1, 1976
Label: A&M/King
Format(s): Cassette
Chart position(s): #36 (JPN)

Ketteiban (The Definitive) (Japan only)
Released: June 21, 1982
Label: A&M/Alfa
Format(s): Cassette
Chart position(s): #61 (JPN)

The Very Best of the Carpenters (Australia and New Zealand only)
Released: 1982
Label: A&M/Festival
Format(s): LP
Chart position(s): #1 (AUS), #2 (NZ)

Only Yesterday (a.k.a. Their Greatest Hits)
Released: March 1990
Label: A&M
Format(s): LP, cassette, CD, digital download
Chart position(s): #1 (UK), #8 (NOR), #9 (AUS), #25 (JPN), #25 (NZ)
Certification(s): 5× Platinum (BPI), Platinum (RIAJ), Platinum (ARIA)

Seishun no Kagayaki: The Best of (22 Hits of the Carpenters) (Japan only)
Released: November 10, 1995
Label: A&M / Polydor Japan
Format(s): CD, MD, cassette
Chart position(s): #3 (JPN)
Certification(s): 12× Platinum (RIAJ)

Yesterday Once More: De Nederlandse Singles Collectie (Netherlands only)
Released: 2001
Label: A&M / Universal
Format(s): CD
Chart position(s): #22 (NVPI)

Singles

Notes

 "Top of the World" charted four times in Japan, at #21 in 1972 and again in 1973 (to coincide with the song's US success), when it peaked at #52. In 1995 it was the B-side of the reissue of "I Need to Be in Love", and subsequently it charted a fourth time (as an A-side) at #83.
 "Bless The Beasts and Children" received enough of its own airplay that Billboard Hot 100 listed the single as "Superstar"/"Bless The Beasts and Children", charting first at #16 on 11/20/71, and then #21 on 11/27/71.
 "Bless The Beasts and Children peaked at #67 on 1/15/71 as an A-side, following 13 weeks listed as the B-side of "Superstar".
 "Sweet, Sweet Smile" peaked at #8 on Billboards Country singles chart.
 "Superstar" and "For All We Know" were released as a double A-side in the UK.
 "I Won't Last a Day Without You" was originally released as an A-side in the UK in 1972 with "Goodbye to Love" as the B-side. However, the sides were switched shortly after the record's release. The former was later released as an A-side in the UK in 1974 to coincide with its first US release as an A-side.
 "Calling Occupants of Interplanetary Craft" reached #1 in the Republic of Ireland, becoming the duo's biggest hit there.
 The UK re-issue of "Merry Christmas, Darling" in 1990 features the second recorded version of the song from their 1978 Christmas Portrait album as opposed to the original 1970 version.

Music videos
"Dancing in the Street" (1968)
"Ticket to Ride" (1969)
"(They Long to Be) Close to You" (1970)
"We've Only Just Begun" (1970)
"For All We Know" (1971)
"Rainy Days and Mondays" (1971)
"Superstar" (1971)
"Hurting Each Other" (1972)
"Top of the World" (1973)
"Yesterday Once More" (1973)
"Jambalaya (On the Bayou)" (1974)
"Sing" (1974)
"Please Mr. Postman" (1974)
"Only Yesterday" (1975)
"There's a Kind of Hush" (1976)
"I Need to Be in Love" (1976)
"Goofus" (1976)
"All You Get from Love Is a Love Song" (1977)
"Calling Occupants of Interplanetary Craft" (1977)
"Sweet, Sweet Smile" (1978)
"Little Girl Blue" (1979)
"When I Fall in Love (1980)
"Touch Me When We're Dancing" (1981)
"(Want You) Back in My Life Again" (1981)
"Those Good Old Dreams" (1981)
"Beechwood 4-5789" (1982)
"Now" (1983)

Holiday 100 chart entries
Since many radio stations in the US adopt a format change to Christmas music each December, many holiday hits have an annual spike in popularity during the last few weeks of the year and are retired once the season is over. In December 2011, Billboard began a Holiday Songs chart with 50 positions that monitors the last five weeks of each year to "rank the top holiday hits of all eras using the same methodology as the Hot 100, blending streaming, airplay, and sales data", and in 2013 the number of positions on the chart was doubled, resulting in the Holiday 100. A handful of Carpenters recordings have made appearances on the Holiday 100 and are noted below according to the holiday season in which they charted there.

Videos

Soundtracks

See also
 List of songs recorded by The Carpenters
 If I Were a Carpenter (tribute album)

References

Discography
Carpenters, The
Pop music group discographies